Nadiia Viktorivna Kichenok (born 20 July 1992) is a Ukrainian professional tennis player. On 6 January 2014, she reached a career-high singles ranking of world No. 100. On 31 January 2022, she peaked at No. 29 in the WTA doubles rankings. Kichenok has won eight WTA Tour doubles titles, including four with her twin sister Lyudmyla. She has also won four singles and 24 doubles titles on the ITF Women's Circuit.

Career
Playing for Ukraine Fed Cup team, Nadiia Kichenok has a win–loss record of 6–6.

In 2015, Nadiia and Lyudmyla came back from a 0–5 deficit in the second set tie-break of their 6–4, 7–6 defeat of Liang Chen and Wang Yafan in the Shenzhen Open final. That made the Kichenoks the second pair of twins, after Karolína and Kristýna Plíšková, to win a WTA Tour doubles title. They had previously been runners-up at Tashkent in 2011, and at Shenzhen in 2014.

At the inaugural edition of the 2022 Tallinn Open seeded third with her sister, she won her eighth title defeating top seeds Nicole Melichar/Laura Siegemund in the final.

At the 2023 Upper Austria Ladies Linz she reached the final with Anna-Lena Friedsam.
At the inaugural edition of the 2023 ATX Open in Austin, Texas, she reached the semifinals also with Friedsam.

Apparel and equipment
Nadiia Kichenok is sponsored by Mizuno and Wilson (racket).

Performance timelines

Singles

Doubles

Significant finals

WTA Elite Trophy

Singles: 1 (title)

WTA career finals

Doubles: 17 (8 titles, 9 runner-ups)

WTA Challenger finals

Doubles: 1 (runner-up)

ITF Circuit finals

Singles: 11 (4 titles, 7 runner–ups)

Doubles: 46 (24 titles, 22 runner–ups)

Notes

References

External links
 
 
 

1992 births
Living people
Ukrainian female tennis players
Sportspeople from Dnipro
Ukrainian twins
Twin sportspeople
Tennis players at the 2016 Summer Olympics
Olympic tennis players of Ukraine
Tennis players at the 2020 Summer Olympics
21st-century Ukrainian women